Caitlin Tiffany Glass (born November 16, 1981) is an American voice actress, ADR director, and script writer at Funimation, New Generation Pictures and Bang Zoom! Entertainment who provides voices for English versions of Japanese anime series and video games.

Biography
Caitlin Tiffany Glass was born on November 16, 1981 in Washington D.C., the daughter of Helen Glass. Glass grew up in the San Diego area and attended middle school and high school in Escondido, California. Glass graduated magna cum laude from the University of Texas at Arlington with a Bachelor of Fine Arts in Theatre Arts in 2004.

While still a college student, Glass went on a Funimation studio tour and was hired the same day by voice director Eric Vale. Her first roles were bit parts in Case Closed until she landed the role of Hiyono Yuizaki in Spiral. Glass then went on to voice Triela in Gunslinger Girl.

One of Glass's most notable roles is Winry Rockbell in the English-language adaptation of the Fullmetal Alchemist anime. Glass was cast as Winry, even though she never thought to audition for the role. Glass tried out for Al, Rose, Lust, and Riza Hawkeye; it was her audition for the character of Rose and her previous "hyper" Hiyono voice in the Spiral series that booked her the role, after reading only a single line of Winry's dialogue. Glass reprised her role in the second anime series, Brotherhood.

Glass's other notable roles include Nefertari Vivi in the Funimation dub of One Piece, Kaori Misaka in Kanon, Yakumo Tsukamoto in School Rumble, Eila Ilmatar Juutilainen in Strike Witches, Saya Minatsuki in Black Cat, Hinata Hino in Future Diary, Accela Warrick in Solty Rei, Eleonora Viltaria in Lord Marksman and Vanadis and Satellizer L. Bridget in Freezing. She can also be heard in Negima!, Kodocha, The Galaxy Railways, Sakura Taisen: Ecole de Paris, and Lupin III OVAs. In addition to her voice work at Funimation, she has also done work for New Generation Pictures and Bang Zoom! Entertainment in California.

In 2006, Glass began her first major ADR directing project, Suzuka and is one of a select few directors working on One Piece. In 2008, she directed the English version of Ouran High School Host Club and played the lead role of Haruhi Fujioka in the show. Along with directing, Glass has sung on theme songs for Funimation dubs.

Personal life
Glass is married to Tony Patterson. She lives in Dallas. Outside of voice acting, she has worked as an ESL teacher in Spain.

Filmography

Anime

Films

Video games

Animation

References

External links
 
  (archive to 2012)
 
 Caitlin Glass at the English Voice Actor & Production Staff Database
 
 

1981 births
Living people
Actresses from Dallas
Actresses from Madrid
Actresses from San Diego
Actresses from Washington, D.C.
American expatriates in Spain
American film actresses
American television actresses
American video game actresses
American voice actresses
People from Arlington, Texas
People from Escondido, California
People from Washington, D.C.
University of Texas at Arlington alumni
American voice directors
21st-century American actresses